Lieutenant General Charles Richard Stickland,  (born 16 May 1968) is a senior Royal Marines officer, who has served as the Chief of Joint Operations since November 2021. He was Commandant General Royal Marines from January 2018 to June 2019.

Early life and education
Stickland was born on 16 May 1968 in Pembury, Kent, England. He was educated at Sevenoaks School, a private school in Kent. He studied at City University, London, graduating with a Bachelor of Science degree in systems and management science and a Master of Arts degree in defence studies.

Military career
Stickland was commissioned into the Royal Marines in 1987. He first saw service in Northern Ireland and went on to complete amphibious operations in the Mediterranean and Far East on anti-smuggling operations. In 1999 he was selected for Staff College and spent time in the Ministry of Defence in procurement; from there he became the Ministry of Defence lead for West and Southern Africa, co-ordinating military activity across the region.

Stickland became Senior UK Liaison Officer with the US XVIII Airborne Corps in Baghdad in 2005 and Chief of Staff of the UK Task Force in Afghanistan in 2006, for which he was awarded a Queen's Commendation for Valuable Service. He returned for another tour in Afghanistan as commander 42 Commando in 2008. On promotion to colonel in 2010, he became team leader of the Fleet Operational Policy team on the 'Gulf Preparedness Initiative' as well as oversight of counterpiracy operations and the Maritime Trade Organisation node in Dubai. He then went on to be Chief of Staff of the Joint Force Headquarters in 2012 and on completion of the Higher Command and Staff Course he became commander of 3 Commando Brigade in 2014. After that he became Chief Joint Force Operations in 2016, a role that entailed a number of non-Combatant Evacuation and Humanitarian Assistance operations.

Promoted to major general in October 2017, Stickland was appointed commander of Operation Atalanta on 7 November. He became Commandant General Royal Marines in January 2018. He handed over command of Commandant General Royal Marines to Major General Matthew Holmes in June 2019. He was appointed Companion of the Order of the Bath in the 2019 Birthday Honours. He became Assistant Chief of the Defence Staff (Operations and Commitments) at the Ministry of Defence in June 2019, and Chief of Joint Operations at the Permanent Joint Headquarters in November 2021.

Personal life
Stickland is married to Mishy and has three sons. His interests include rugby, climbing and skiing.

References

|-

|-

Royal Marines generals
Officers of the Order of the British Empire
Royal Navy personnel of the War in Afghanistan (2001–2021)
Royal Navy personnel of the Iraq War
Living people
Companions of the Order of the Bath
Recipients of the Commendation for Valuable Service
1968 births
People educated at Sevenoaks School
Alumni of City, University of London
People from Pembury
Military personnel from Kent